Suburban Girl MedER is a Georgian medical drama series, which was shot by Night Show Studio in 2012. The series is a continuation of a soap opera of the same name Suburban Girl . Producers had decided to didn't continue the storyline and the end of season 5 series is over, but the show's success prompted to continue. The series is not the original, it's based on the popular American medical drama Grey's Anatomy.

Story
The story develops in medical hospital called MedER, the owner is a popular businessman called Archil Tsilosani who is in coma, his son, Nika Gegelidze is waiting for the day of his father's health improvement. The hospital has a new training program for the doctors, which leads to the teaching practice in the medical field, one of the contestants is Keta, a girl who develops in the series. Keta recently came in Tbilisi, trying to leave the past problems and start a new life. In the bar, she accidentally meets one guy, with whom she spends one night, but fate has a laugh for her and this guy turns out to be the hospital's main doctor and also head of the trainers, and has just started to work.

Filming locations and technique
Night Show Studio for series specifically preparing a decoration's and shooting was pending different pavilions

Main characters

Episode Role
 Goga Chkheidze - Giorgi Vachnadze - Resident doctor                                       
 Nuka Margvelashvili - Nanka, Tatukas Friend # 1
 Natia Tsitsilashvili - Anka, Tatukas Friend # 2
 Lali Badurashvili - Liana from the bank
 Davit Velijanashvili
 Giorgi Kapanadze
 Irma Berianidze - Nina's Friend # 1
 Nino Tarkhan-Mouravi - Nina's Friend # 2

References

2010s Georgia (country) television series
Imedi TV original programming